This is a list of artists who have recorded for Warner Records (formerly Warner Bros. Records).
Listed in parentheses are names of Warner-affiliated labels for which the artist recorded.

0-9
10cc (US)
1nonly
4 Non Blondes
99 Neighbors

A
A-ha
Aaron Goodvin (Warner Music Canada)
Aaron Space
Abandoned Pools (Extasy International/Warner Bros.)
ABBA (Mushroom/Warner Bros.)
Above the Law (Ruthless/Giant/Warner Bros.)
Adam Lambert
Adam Mitchell
Adam Sandler
Addrisi Brothers
aespa (US)
Agnes Chan
Al B. Sure!
Al Jarreau
Alanis Morissette (Maverick/ Warner Bros.)
Alex Haley
Alexa Feser
Ali Gatie
Alice Coltrane
Alice Cooper
All Saints
Allan Sherman
Altered State
Amanda Ghost
Amazing Rhythm Aces
Amber (Tommy Boy/Warner Bros.)
Ambrosia
Amelia Lily
America
Amy Grant (Word/Curb/Warner Bros.)
Andraé Crouch
Angelic Upstarts
Anita Cochran (Warner Bros. Nashville)
The Anita Kerr Singers
Anitta
Anne-Marie
Anthony and the Camp
Antonio Carlos Jobim
Aphex Twin (Sire/Warner Bros.)
Apollonia 6
Arctic Monkeys (Domino/Warner Bros.)
Arlo Guthrie
Armor for Sleep
Arthur Alexander
Ash (Record Collection/Warner Bros.)
Ashford & Simpson
Ashley McBryde (Warner Music Nashville)
Ashley Tisdale
Atlantic Starr
Atlas Genius
Avenged Sevenfold
Aztec Camera

B
B.W. Stevenson
Baby Ford (Sire/Warner Bros.)
Bad Brains (Maverick/Warner Bros.)
Badfinger
Bailey Zimmerman (Warner Music Nashville)
Banda Black Rio (Warner/Atlantic/Elektra/WEA International)
Bandana (Warner Bros. Nashville)
Banks & Steelz
Barenaked Ladies (Reprise/Warner Bros.)
Baskery
Bat for Lashes
Battlecat (Maverick/Warner Bros.)
Baxter (Maverick/Warner Bros.)
Beaver & Krause
Bebe Rexha
Bee Gees
Béla Fleck
Bella Poarch
Ben Lee
Benson Boone
Betsy
Bette Midler
Biffy Clyro
Big & Rich (Warner Bros. Nashville)
Big Daddy Kane (Cold Chillin'/Reprise/Warner Bros.)
Big Data
Bill Cosby
Delia Bell
Bill Haley & His Comets
Bill Sims (PBS/Warner Bros.)
Billy Hill (Reprise/Warner Bros.)
Billy Montana (Warner Bros. Nashville)
Billy Ray Cyrus (Curb/Word/Warner Bros. Nashville)
Biohazard
Biz Markie (Cold Chillin'/Warner Bros.)
Black Sabbath (North America)
Black Uhuru (Mango/Island/Warner Bros.)
Blake Shelton (Warner Music Nashville)
Blonde
Blur (Parlophone/Warner)
Bob James
Bob Newhart
Bobby King
Body Count (Sire/Warner Bros.)
Boney James
Bonnie Prudden
Bonnie Raitt
Boom Crash Opera
Bootsy Collins
Bootsy's Rubber Band
Brad Mehldau
Brady Seals (Warner Bros. Nashville)
Brandy
Brandy Clark (Warner Music Nashville)
Brenda Lee (Warner Bros. Nashville)
Brett Eldredge (Warner Music Nashville)
Brett Kissel (Warner Music Canada)
Brian Eno (Opal/Warner Bros.) (US)
Brian Wilson (Giant/Warner Bros.)
Bronx Style Bob (Sire/Warner Bros.)
Brother Sundance
Brougham
Bryan Ferry (E.G./Warner Bros.)
Built to Spill
Bulletboys
Burning Spear (Slash/Warner Bros.)

C
Candi Staton
Candlebox (Maverick/Sire/Warner Bros.)
Captain Beyond
Cardiknox
Carl Stalling
Carlene Carter (Giant/Warner Bros. Nashville)
Carlie Hanson
Carly Simon
Carmen Electra (Paisley Park/Warner Bros.)
Carole Davis
Catherine McGrath
Cavetown
Cerrone
Chad Brock (Warner Bros. Nashville)
Chad Mitchell
Chaka Khan
Charles Wright & the Watts 103rd Street Rhythm Band
Chase Atlantic
Chase Matthew (Warner bros. Nashville)
Cheap Trick
Cher
Cher (US)
Chester Bennington
Chic
Chicago (Full Moon/Warner Bros.)
Chiddy Bang (Parlophone)
Chika
China Crisis (US)
Chino XL
Chris Janson (Warner Music Nashville)
Christine McVie
Christopher Cross
Ciara
Cibo Matto
Citizen King
CJ
Clay Walker (Giant/Warner Bros. Nashville)
Cleopatra (Maverick/Warner Bros.) (US)
Climax Blues Band
Club Cheval
Club Nouveau
Cody Johnson (Warner Music Nashville)
Cole Swindell (Warner Music Nashville)
Colosseum (US/Canada)
Con Hunley (Warner Bros. Nashville)
Confide (Science/Warner Bros.)
Connie Stevens
Control Freq (F-111/Warner Bros.)
Conway Twitty (Warner Bros. Nashville)
Cool for August
Cornershop (Luaka Bop/Warner Bros.)
Cowboy Troy (Raybaw/Warner Bros. Nashville)
Crawford/West (Warner Bros. Nashville)
Cristina D'Avena (Warner Music Italy)
Crystal Gayle (Warner Bros. Nashville)
Curtis Mayfield
Curved Air
Cut Snake

D
D:Ream (Sire/Giant/Warner Bros.)
D-A-D
Da Bush Babees
Dale (Paisley Park/Warner Bros.)
Damien Rice
Damn Yankees
Damon Albarn (US)
Dan + Shay (Warner Music Nashville)
Dan Seals (Warner Bros. Nashville)
Dana Dane (Maverick/Warner Bros.)
Daniel Lanois
Danielle Dax (Sire/Warner Bros.)
Danny O'Keefe
Dark New Day
Darrell Clanton
Dave Grusin
David Ball (Warner Bros. Nashville)
David Frizzell (Viva/Warner Bros. Nashville)
David Guetta (Parlophone) (US)
David Lee Roth
David Rudder (Sire/Warner Bros.)
David Ruffin 
David Sanborn
David Van Tieghem
Dawn Sears
Daye Jack
De La Soul (Tommy Boy/Warner Bros.)
Dead By Sunrise (Machine Shop/Warner)
Dean Martin
Death from Above 1979 (US only)
Debby Boone (Curb/Warner Bros.)
Debi Nova
Deep Purple (North America/Japan)
Deftones (Maverick/Reprise/Warner)
Deftones (Maverick/Warner Bros.)
Delta Rae (Sire/Warner)
Dennis Miller
Dennis Robbins (Giant/Warner Bros.)
Depeche Mode (Sire/Warner Bros.; North and Central America)
Devin Dawson (Warner Music Nashville)
Devo (outside Europe)
Diamond
Dick and Dee Dee
Digital Nas
Digital Underground (Tommy Boy/Warner Bros.)
Dio (US/Canada)
Dion
Dionne Warwick
Dire Straits (US)
Disciples
Disturbed (Giant/Reprise/Warner)
Djivan Gasparyan (Opal/Warner Bros.)
Don Henley
Don Rickles
Donald Fagen
Donna Loren
Donna Summer (non-USA)
Doobie Brothers
Dorothy Provine
Dory Previn
Doug Kershaw (Warner Bros. Nashville)
Dr. John
Dua Lipa (outside Germany/Austria/Switzerland)
Duncan Dhu (Sire/Warner Bros.)
Duran Duran
Dusty Drake (Warner Bros. Nashville)
Dutchavelli (Parlophone)
Dwight Yoakam (Warner Music Nashville)
Dylan Gardner

E
E-40
Earl Klugh
Earl Sweatshirt
Earshot
Earth, Wind & Fire
Ed Sheeran (Atlantic Records)
Edd Byrnes
Eddie Hazel
Eddie Rabbitt (Warner Bros. Nashville)
Eikichi Yazawa
Eisley
El DeBarge
Electronic
Eliza Carthy
Elizabeth Cook (Warner Bros. Nashville)
Ella Henderson
Elvis Costello
Emmylou Harris (Warner Bros. Nashville)
Enya (Warner Music UK)
Erasure (Maverick/Warner Bros.)
Eric Andersen
Eric Clapton (Duck/Warner Bros.)
Eric Clapton (Warner/Reprise)
Euge Groove
Deodato
Evan Taubenfeld (Sire/Warner Bros.)
Everlast
Everything but the Girl (Sire/Warner Bros.) (US)
Exile (Curb/Warner Bros)
Eye to Eye

F
Faces
Failure (Slash/Warner Bros.)
Faith Hill (Warner Bros. Nashville)
Falco (Sire/Warner Bros.)
Fam First DFG (Warner Bros./Fam Eats First.)
Father Guido Sarducci
Faze Action (F-111/Warner Bros.)
Feder
Figures on a Beach (Sire/Warner Bros.)
Five (Festival Mushroom/Warner Bros.)
Flame (Giant/Warner Bros.)
Fleet Foxes (Nonesuch/Warner)
Fleetwood Mac
Flim & the BB's
Foals
Force MD's (Tommy Boy/Warner Bros.)
Fort Minor (Machine Shop/Warner)
Fourplay
Frankie Ballard (Warner Bros. Nashville)
Frankie Beverly
Freddie Gibbs
Funkadelic

G
Gabby Barrett (Warner Music Nashville)
Gail Davies (Warner Bros. Nashville)
Gang of Four (North America)
Gang of Youths (outside Australia and New Zealand)
Gary Clark Jr.
Gary Morris (Warner Bros. Nashville)
Gary Wright
Gene Watson (Warner Bros. Nashville)
George Benson
George Clinton (Paisley Park/Warner Bros.)
George Duke
George Harrison (Dark Horse/Warner Bros.)
Georgia Middleman (Giant/Warner Bros.)
Gerard Way (Reprise/Warner)
Gilda Radner
Gina G (Eternal/Warner Bros.)
Glassjaw
Glenn Yarbrough
Glorified Magnified (Sire/Warner Bros.)
Gods Child (Qwest/Warner Bros.)
Golden Features
Goo Goo Dolls (Metal Blade/Warner)
Good Question (Paisley Park/Warner Bros.)
GTA
Gordon Lightfoot
Gorillaz (Parlophone/Warner)
Graham Bond
Graham Central Station
Grateful Dead
Green Day (Reprise Records/Warner Bros.)
Green Velvet (F-111/Warner Bros.)
Greg Holden
Greg Holland (Warner Bros. Nashville)
Griff
Gus Dapperton
Gwen Guthrie

H
Hank Thompson (Warner Bros. Nashville)
Hank Williams Jr. (Curb/Warner Bros. Nashville)
Hard Meat
Harold Budd (Opal/Warner Bros.)
Harper's Bizarre
Herbie Hancock
Highway 101 (Warner Bros. Nashville)
Hilly Michaels
Hiroshima (Qwest/Warner Bros.)
Hobo Johnson
Holly Dunn (Warner Bros. Nashville)
Holy Moses
Honeymoon Suite (US)
Houndmouth
House of Pain (Tommy Boy/Warner Bros.)
Howie Mandel
Hugh Laurie
Hugo Largo (Opal/Warner Bros.)
Hüsker Dü

I
Ice-T (Sire/Warner Bros.)
Idina Menzel
IDK
Ike & Tina Turner (Loma/Warner Bros.)
iLoveMakonnen
Information Society (Tommy Boy/Warner Bros.)
Ingrid Chavez (Paisley Park/Warner Bros.)
Iris DeMent
Isaiah Rashad (Top Dawg/Warner)
IShowSpeed (Warner Records)
IU (Atlantic Records)

J
J Balvin
Jack Palance
Jack Webb
Jackie Lomax
Jade (Giant/Warner Bros.)
Jaheim
Jake Miller
James Carter
James Darren
The House Band
James Ingram (Qwest/Warner Bros.)
James Taylor
James Wesley Prosser (Warner Bros. Nashville)
Jane Child
Jane's Addiction
Janice Robinson
Jasmine Guy
Jeff Lorber
Jennifer Trynin (Squint/Warner Bros.)
Jenny Lewis
Jeremy Jordan (Giant/Warner Bros.)
Jerry Fielding
Jerry Lee Lewis (Sire/Warner Bros.)
Napoleon XIV
Jesse Colin Young
Jessica Harp (Warner Bros. Nashville)
Jetski
Jill Jones (Paisley Park/Warner Bros.)
Jim Carroll (Giant/Warner Bros.)
Jimi Hendrix (Reprise/Warner Bros.)
Jimmy Durante
Joanie Sommers
Joanna Cotten (Warner Bros. Nashville)
Jocelyn Brown
Joe "Fingers" Carr
Joe Nichols (Giant/Warner Bros. Nashville)
Joe Sample
Joe Walsh
John Anderson (Warner Bros. Nashville)
John Cale
John Fogerty
John Hartford
John Mellencamp
John Michael Montgomery (Warner Bros. Nashville)
John Raitt and the Kids
John Scott Trotter
John Simon
Johnny Lee (Warner Bros. Nashville)
Johnny Sea
JoJo
Jon Hassell
Joni Harms (Warner Bros. Nashville)
Jordan Witzigreuter
Josh Groban (Reprise/Warner)
Joshua Bassett
Joshua Redman
Josiah Leming
JR JR
Julee Cruise
Julia Sweeney
Julie Brown (Sire/Warner Bros.)
Juluka
Jungle Brothers
Junior Walker

K
K7 (Tommy Boy/Warner Bros.)
k.d. lang (Sire/Warner Bros.)
Karen Brooks (Warner Bros. Nashville)
Karyn White
Kaskade
Kate and Anna McGarrigle
Kate Earl (Record Collection/Warner Bros.)
Kath & Kim (FMR/Warner Bros.)
Kathie Lee Gifford
Kaya Stewart
Keith Washington (Qwest/Warner Bros.)
Ken Laszlo
Kenny Chesney (Warner Music Nashville)
Kenny Garrett
Kenny Young
The Reese Project (Giant/Warner Bros.)
Kid Capri (Cold Chillin'/Warner Bros.)
Kid Creole and the Coconuts (Sire/Warner Bros.)
Kidneythieves (Extasy International/Warner Bros.)
Kim Carnes
Kimbra
King Crimson (EG/Warner Bros.) (US & Canada)
Kirk Whalum
Klangstof
Ondar
Kool G Rap & DJ Polo (Cold Chillin'/Warner Bros.)
Kraftwerk (US & Canada)

L
Ladysmith Black Mambazo
Laid Back (Sire/Warner Bros.)
Lalaine
Lamont Dozier
Lane Turner (Warner Bros. Nashville)
Larry Graham
Laura Dawn (Extasy International/Warner Bros.)
Laura Marano
Laura Pausini
Lauren Lucas (Warner Bros. Nashville)
Laurie Anderson
Laurindo Almeida
Lawrence Reynolds
Leigh-Anne Pinnock
Lena Horne (Qwest/Warner Bros.)
Leo Sayer (US/Canada)
Leon Redbone
Les Négresses Vertes (Sire/Warner Bros.)
Leschea
Leslie Satcher
Less Than Jake (Sire/Warner Bros.)
Liam Gallagher
Lianne La Havas (Nonesuch/Warner)
Liberace
Lil Pump
Lila McCann (Warner Bros. Nashville)
Lily Allen (Regal/Parlophone/Warner) (US)
Lindemann
Lindsay Pagano
Linkin Park (Currently on hold)
Little Feat
Little Richard
Little Texas (Warner Bros. Nashville)
Loona (Atlantic Records)
Loreena McKennitt
Lori McKenna (Warner Bros. Nashville)
Lorraine Ellison (Loma/Warner Bros.)
Los Lobos (Slash/Warner Bros.)
Lou Reed (Sire/Warner Bros.)
Love De-Luxe
Laura Pergolizzi (LP)
Lukas Graham (outside Scandinavia and France)
Lyle Mays
Lynsey de Paul (UK/Europe)

M
M (Sire/Warner Bros.)
M.C. Shan (Cold Chillin'/Warner Bros.)
M2M (US)
Mac McAnally (Warner Bros. Nashville)
Mac Miller 
Mac Miller (Reprise)
Madhouse (Paisley Park/Warner Bros.)
Madleen Kane
Madonna (Warner Bros./Maverick/Sire)
Magic Dirt
Majid Jordan (OVO Sound/Warner)
Major Figgas (Ruffnation/Warner Bros.)
Malo
Manfred Mann's Earth Band (US & Canada)
Manu Dibango (Giant/Warner Bros.)
Margo Smith (Warner Bros. Nashville)
Maria Muldaur
Marion Raven
Marit Larsen
Mark Knopfler (US)
Mark O'Connor (Warner Bros. Nashville)
Mark Turner
Martini Ranch (Sire/Warner Bros.)
Marty Paich
Marty Robbins (Warner Bros. Nashville)
Mary Travers
Mason Williams
Mastodon (Reprise/Warner)
Maude Latour
Maura O'Connell
Maureen McGovern
Mavis Staples (Paisley Park/Warner Bros.)
Mayra Veronica
Mazarati (Paisley Park/Warner Bros.)
Maze
Meg & Dia (Doghouse/Warner Bros.)
Meghan Patrick (Warner Music Canada)
Mêlée
Melissa Lawson (Warner Bros. Nashville)
Mephisto Odyssey
Mest (Maverick/Warner Bros.)
Metallica (US & Canada)
Michael Bublé (143/Warner)
Michael Franks
Michael Martin Murphey (Warner Bros. Nashville)
Michael McDonald
Michael Sembello
Michael White
MIKA (Warner Bros./Mushroom/Festival)
Mike de Albuquerque
Mike Shinoda
Miles Davis
Milt Jackson (Qwest/Warner Bros.)
Ministry
Miriam Makeba
Missing Persons
Modern Jazz Quartet
Moloko (Echo/Warner Bros.)
Monie Love
Montrose
More
Morris Day (Paisley Park/Warner Bros.)
Morten Harket
Mr. Bungle (North America)
Muse (Helium 3/Warner)
My Bloody Valentine (Sire/Warner Bros.)
My Chemical Romance (Reprise)
Mystery Skulls

N
Naughty by Nature (Tommy Boy/Warner Bros.)
Nazareth (US/Canada)
Neal McCoy (Warner Bros. Nashville)
Neil Young (Reprise/Warner)
Neon Hitch
Nessa Barrett
Never Shout Never (Loveway/Warner)
New Order (Qwest/Warner Bros.) (US)
New Politics (DCD2/Warner)
Nico & Vinz
Nicolette Larson
Nightmare of You (Sire/Warner Bros.)
Nile Rodgers
Nines
Nitty Gritty Dirt Band (Warner Bros. Nashville)
NLE Choppa

O
Ofra Haza (Sire/Warner Bros.)
Oingo Boingo (Giant/Warner Bros.)
Olive (Maverick/Warner Bros.)
Oliver Heldens
One 2 One
One Ok Rock (Fueled By Ramen/Atlantic/Warner)

P
Pam Tillis (Warner Bros. Nashville)
Paris Hilton
Jamie
Partybaby
PartyNextDoor
Pat Metheny
Patti Austin (Qwest/Warner Bros.)
Paul Jabara
Paul Parker (Sire/Warner Bros.)
Paul Simon
Paul Stookey
Paul Weller
Paula Cole (Imago/Warner Bros.)
Pecos and the Rooftops
Pendulum
Perry Farrell
Peter Cetera (Full Moon/Warner Bros.)
Peter Yarrow
Peter, Paul & Mary
Petula Clark (US)
Phajja
Phases
Pinkard & Bowden (Warner Bros. Nashville)
Porno for Pyros
PrettyMuch (Sire Records)
Primal Scream (Sire/Warner Bros.)
Prince (Paisley Park/NPG/Warner Bros.)
Priory
Public Image Limited (US)
Pvris (Reprise/Warner)

Q
Quacky Duck and His Barnyard Friends
Quad City DJ's
Queen Latifah (Tommy Boy/Warner Bros.)
Quincy Jones (Qwest/Warner Bros.)

R
R.E.M.
Rabbitt (Capricorn/Warner Bros.) (US/Canada)
Radioactive Cats
Rahsaan Roland Kirk
Ramones (Sire/Warner Bros.)
Randy Crawford
Randy Newman
Randy Travis (Warner Bros. Nashville)
Ray Charles (Qwest/Warner Bros.)
Ray Heindorf
Ray Scott (Warner Bros. Nashville)
Ray Stevens (Warner Bros. Nashville)
RBX (Premeditated/Warner Bros.)
Real Like You
Red Box (Sire/Warner Bros.)
Red Hot Chili Peppers
RedOne
Regina Spektor (Sire/Warner)
Remble
Renaissance (Warner Bros. UK)
Residual Kid
Rhino Bucket
Ric Ocasek (Maverick/Warner Bros.)
Richard Hawley
Richard "Groove" Holmes
Richard Pryor
Rick Springfield
Rick Trevino (Warner Bros. Nashville)
Rickie Lee Jones
Rilo Kiley
Robben Ford
Robert Mirabal
Robert Schimmel
Robyn Ottolini (Warner Nashville)
Rockers Hi-Fi
Rod McKuen
Rod Stewart
Rodney Crowell (Warner Bros. Nashville)
Roger Troutman 
Roger Voudouris
Rollerskate Skinny
Ronnie Wood
Rose Royce
Rosebud
Roxy Music (E.G./Warner Bros.) (US/Canada)
Roy Woods (OVO Sound/Warner)
Royal Blood
RPM
Rufus
Ry Cooder

S
S'Express (Rhythm King/Sire/Warner Bros.)
Saafir (Qwest/Warner Bros.)
Sacha Distel
Saga
SahBabii
Saint Etienne
SAINt JHN
Sam Kinison
Sandra St. Victor
Sanford-Townsend Band
Saukrates
Savoy
Saweetie
Scritti Politti (North America)
Seal
Seal (ZTT/Sire/Warner Bros.)
Seals and Crofts
Seatrain
Sex Pistols (North America)
Sha EK
Shadowfax
Shannon Brown (Warner Bros. Nashville)
Shaun Cassidy
Shawn Lane
Sheila E.
Shelly West (Viva/Warner Bros. Nashville)
Sherbert (Festival Mushroom/Warner Bros.)
Sherrick
Shriekback
Sisters of Glory
Sixwire (Warner Bros. Nashville)
Skrew (Metal Blade/Warner Bros.)
Skyhooks (Mushroom/Warner Bros.)
Slade
Sleeping With Sirens
Sofia Shinas
Soft Cell (Sire/Warner Bros.) (US/Canada)
Son Volt
Sophia George (Sire/Warner Bros.)
Soul Coughing (Slash/Warner Bros.)
Southern Pacific (Warner Bros. Nashville)
Spencer Ludwig
Spike Jones
Spirea X
Static-X
Tin Tin (Sire/Warner Bros.)
Stereophonics 
Stetsasonic (Tommy Boy/Warner Bros.)
Steve Earle (Warner Bros. Nashville)
Steve Forbert
Steve Martin
Steve Stevens
Steve Winwood (Island/Warner Bros.)
Steven Van Zandt (Rhino/Warner Bros.)
Steven Wright
Stevie Nicks
Stoneground
Stormzy
Stuff
Sue Saad and the Next
Sven Väth
Swallow
Sway & King Tech (Giant/Warner Bros.)
Sylvester

T
T. Rex
T.G. Sheppard (Curb/Warner Bros. Nashville)
Tab Hunter
Taking Back Sunday
Talking Heads (Sire/Warner Bros.)
Tamia (Qwest/Warner Bros.)
Tara Kemp (Giant/Warner Bros.)
Tarantula
TBTBT (Cold Chillin'/Warner Bros.)
Teairra Marí
Teen Dream
Tegan and Sara (Sire/Warner)
Telex (Slash/Warner Bros.)
Terri Gibbs (Warner Bros. Nashville)
Tevin Campbell (Qwest/Warner Bros.)
The Arcs
The Association
The Avalanches
The B-52's (Americas/Australia)
The Band
The Beau Brummels
The Bellamy Brothers (Curb/Warner Bros. Nashville)
The Black Keys (Nonesuch/Warner)
The Church (US/Canada)
The Collectors
The Cribs
The Cure (Sire/Warner Bros.) (US/Canada/New Zealand)
The D.O.C. (Giant/Warner Bros.)
The Dead Weather
The Derailers (Sire/Warner Bros.)
The Dream Academy (Reprise/Warner Bros.)
The Dukes
The Everly Brothers
The Family (Paisley Park/Warner Bros.)
The Flaming Lips
The Forester Sisters (Warner Bros. Nashville)
The Four Seasons
The Head and the Heart
The Hues Corporation
The Ides of March
The Isley Brothers
The JaneDear Girls (Warner Bros. Nashville)
The Jesus and Mary Chain
The Judybats (Sire/Warner Bros.)
The Magician
The Maine
The Marketts
The Mavis's (Festival Mushroom Records/Warner Bros.)
The McCarters (Warner Bros. Nashville)
The Mighty Lemon Drops (Sire/Warner Bros.)
The Neon Philharmonic
The Network
The Notting Hillbillies
The Premiers
The Pretenders (Real/Sire/Warner Bros.) (US)
The Pretty Things
The Prodigy (Cooking Vinyl/Maverick/Warner Bros.)
The Regrettes
The Roches
The Routers
The Rutles
The Shelters
Ramona King
The Sky Kings (Warner Bros. Nashville)
The Smiths (Sire/Warner Bros.) (US/Canada)
The Three O'Clock (Paisley Park/Warner Bros.)
The Time
The Tokens
The Velvet Underground (Sire/Warner Bros.)
The Walters
The White Stripes (Icky Thump)
The Whites (Warner Bros. Nashville)
The Who
The Wild Feathers
The Wilkinsons (Giant/Warner Bros. Nashville)
The Wreckers (Maverick/Warner Bros. Nashville)
The Youngbloods
Theophilus London
THEY. (Mind Of a Genius/Warner)
Thomas Dolby (Giant/Warner Bros.) (US)
Thompson Twins
Throwing Muses (Sire/Warner Bros.)
Tim Buckley
Tim Maia (Warner/Atlantic/Elektra/WEA International/Warner-Continental)
Tim Mensy (Giant/Warner Bros.)
Tim Ryan (Warner Bros. Nashville)
TKA (Tommy Boy/Warner Bros.)
Todd Rundgren (Bearsville/Warner Bros.)
Tom Petty and the Heartbreakers (Reprise/Warner)
Tom Petty
Tom Tom Club (Sire/Warner Bros.)
Tommy Page (Sire/Warner Bros.)
Tony Joe White
Tower of Power
Trapt
Traveling Wilburys (Wilbury/Warner Bros.)
Travis Tritt (Warner Bros. Nashville)
Tribe (Slash/Warner Bros.)
Trick Pony (Warner Bros. Nashville)
Turley Richards
Twenty One Pilots (Fueled by Ramen/Warner)
Twin Shadow
Tynisha Keli

U
Ultra Naté
Ultramarine (Sire/Giant Warner Bros.)
Uriah Heep

V
V Factory
Van Dyke Parks
Van Halen
Van Morrison
Vanity 6
Vicki Sue Robinson (Rhino/Warner Bros.)
Vince Guaraldi
Vince Neil
Violent Femmes (Slash/Warner Bros.)

W
Waka Flocka Flame
Wale (rapper)
Wallace Roney
Wavves
We've Got a Fuzzbox and We're Gonna Use It
Whitesnake (Geffen/Warner Bros.)
William Orbit (Maverick/Warner Bros.)
Wiz Khalifa
World Renown
Womack & Womack
Wright Brothers Band (Warner Bros. Nashville)

Y
Yellowjackets
YFN Lucci
Yolanda Be Cool
Baby Tate

Z
Zach Bryan (Warner Music Nashville)
Zapp
ZZ Top
 Zzz. (Grade A/Warner)

See also
 Warner Records
 List of Reprise Records artists
 Reprise Records

References

Warner Records, former